Helena Willman-Grabowska (4 January 1870 in Warsaw – 31 October 1957 in Kraków) was Polish indologist. A lecturer at the Sorbonne, she was also one of the first female professors at Jagiellonian University. She is best remembered for her publications Les composés nominaux dàns le Śatapathabrāhmana (1927–28), Le chien dans le Rigveda et l'Avesta (1931), L'idée de l'etat dans l'Inde ancienne (1933), and Expiacja (prāyaścitti) in Brāhman (1935).

References 

1870 births
1957 deaths
Polish anthropologists
Indologists
Academic staff of Jagiellonian University
Academic staff of Paris-Sorbonne University
University of Lausanne alumni
University of Bern alumni